Veskijärv (also Tamra Lake) is a lake in Lääne-Nigula Parish, Lääne County, Estonia.

The lake is a part of Läänemaa Suursoo Landscape Conservation Area.

References

Lääne-Nigula Parish
Lakes of Estonia